Neopycnodonte cochlear is a species of marine bivalve molluscs belonging to the family Gryphaeidae.

Fossil records
This species have been recorded as fossils from the Miocene to the Quaternary (from 15.97 to 0.012 Ma).

Description
Shells are usually brownish or purplish, quite thin, without prominent ribs. The lower valve is rounded, the upper valve is smaller.

Distribution
This species can be found in the North Atlantic Ocean (Azores)  and in the Mediterranean Sea.

References

Gryphaeidae
Bivalves described in 1795
Taxa named by Giuseppe Saverio Poli